Pedro Linhart (born 30 December 1962) is a Spanish professional golfer.

Linhart was born Las Palmas, Gran Canaria, Spain to American parents, and took up Spanish citizenship in the 1980s. He turned professional in 1982, and after a failed visit to European Tour qualifying school in 1986 he spent time working as an assistant pro in New Jersey and playing on the mini-tour circuit in the United States.

Linhart won a European Tour card at his second attempt and was a rookie on the tour in 1994. In 1995 he won the Canarias Challenge, a Challenge Tour event, on the islands of his birth. In 1999 he won the Madeira Island Open on the main European tour, but he suffered a wrist injury in 2000 and was unable to build on this success. In 2007, Pedro finished 2nd in the Qualifying School for the European Tour, and therefore regained his card.

Professional wins (4)

European Tour wins (1)

Challenge Tour wins (1)

Alps Tour wins (1)

European Senior Tour wins (1)

Results in major championships

Note: Linhart only played in The Open Championship.

CUT = missed the half-way cut

See also
2007 European Tour Qualifying School graduates

External links

American male golfers
Spanish male golfers
European Tour golfers
European Senior Tour golfers
Golfers from New Jersey
Spanish people of American descent
Sportspeople from Las Palmas
1962 births
Living people